Yoshinobu Ota  (born November 13, 1972) is a Japanese mixed martial artist. He competed in the Featherweight division.

Mixed martial arts record

|-
| Loss
| align=center| 4-6-3
| Seiji Ozuka
| Submission (Straight Armbar)
| GCM: Demolition 031227
| 
| align=center| 1
| align=center| 1:40
| Tokyo, Japan
| 
|-
| Draw
| align=center| 4-5-3
| Daichi Fujiwara
| Draw
| Pancrase: Hybrid 8
| 
| align=center| 2
| align=center| 5:00
| Osaka, Osaka, Japan
| 
|-
| Loss
| align=center| 4-5-2
| Miki Shida
| Decision (Unanimous)
| Pancrase: Hybrid 6
| 
| align=center| 2
| align=center| 5:00
| Tokyo, Japan
| 
|-
| Draw
| align=center| 4-4-2
| Miki Shida
| Draw (Unanimous)
| Pancrase: Spirit 6
| 
| align=center| 2
| align=center| 5:00
| Osaka, Osaka, Japan
| 
|-
| Win
| align=center| 4-4-1
| Noriyuki Takeuchi
| Submission (Guillotine Choke)
| Deep: clubDeep Ozon
| 
| align=center| 1
| align=center| 0:42
| Nagoya
| 
|-
| Loss
| align=center| 3-4-1
| Naoyuki Kotani
| Technical Submission (Rear-Naked Choke)
| Rings: World Title Series Grand Final
| 
| align=center| 1
| align=center| 1:41
| Kanagawa, Japan
| 
|-
| Draw
| align=center| 3-3-1
| Takumi Yano
| Draw
| Pancrase: Proof 5
| 
| align=center| 2
| align=center| 5:00
| Osaka, Osaka, Japan
| 
|-
| Loss
| align=center| 3-3
| Masahiro Oishi
| Submission (Rear Naked Choke)
| Shooto: To The Top 2
| 
| align=center| 2
| align=center| 2:48
| Tokyo, Japan
| 
|-
| Loss
| align=center| 3-2
| Mamoru Yamaguchi
| KO (Knee)
| Shooto: R.E.A.D. 9
| 
| align=center| 3
| align=center| 2:21
| Yokohama, Kanagawa, Japan
| 
|-
| Win
| align=center| 3-1
| Norio Nishiyama
| Technical Submission (Rear-Naked Choke)
| Shooto: R.E.A.D. 2
| 
| align=center| 1
| align=center| 0:28
| Tokyo, Japan
| 
|-
| Loss
| align=center| 2-1
| Jin Akimoto
| Decision (Unanimous)
| Shooto: Gateway to the Extremes
| 
| align=center| 2
| align=center| 5:00
| Setagaya, Tokyo, Japan
| 
|-
| Win
| align=center| 2-0
| Norio Nishiyama
| Decision (Unanimous)
| Shooto: Renaxis 3
| 
| align=center| 2
| align=center| 5:00
| Setagaya, Tokyo, Japan
| 
|-
| Win
| align=center| 1-0
| Hiroaki Yoshioka
| Decision (Majority)
| Shooto: Shooter's Soul
| 
| align=center| 2
| align=center| 5:00
| Setagaya, Tokyo, Japan
|

See also
List of male mixed martial artists

References

1972 births
Japanese male mixed martial artists
Featherweight mixed martial artists
Living people